The 1986 Nations motorcycle Grand Prix was the second race of the 1986 Grand Prix motorcycle racing season. It took place on the weekend of 16–18 May 1986, at the Autodromo Nazionale Monza.

Classification

500 cc

References

Italian motorcycle Grand Prix
Nations
Nations